Vladimir Magomedovich Semyonov (b. 1940) is a Russian General of the army and the first president of the Karachay–Cherkess Republic (1999–2003).

Biography 
Semyonov was born on 8 June 1940 in the village of Khuzruk, Karachayevsky District, and has an ethnic Karachay father and an ethnic Russian mother. He is a Sunni Muslim. He joined the Soviet Army in 1958. He completed the Baku military college in 1962, the M. V. Frunze Military Academy in 1970 and the General Staff Academy in 1979.

Career 
He is a professional military commander. In 1988, Vladimir Semyonov was appointed as the head of the Transbaikal Military District. In 1991, he became a commander-in-chief of Soviet Land Forces and deputy minister of the Ministry of Defence. From 1992 to 1996 Vladimir Semyonov headed the Russian Ground Forces. He was dismissed from his post by the Russian Defence Minister Igor Rodionov in 1996 but returned to duty in 1998 as Chief Military Adviser to the Minister of Defense of Russia.

In May 1999 he won the presidential elections in Karachay–Cherkessia which caused ethnic tension between Karachays and Cherkesses. The tension was pacified without bloodshed. Vladimir Semyonov tried to solve socio-economic problems of the Republic but in vain. On August 31, 2003, he lost in the general election and left his post to Mustafa Batdyyev.

Semyonov is married with one daughter.

External links 
in Russian

References 

1940 births
Living people
People from Karachayevsky District
Soviet colonel generals
Generals of the army (Russia)
Heads of Karachay-Cherkessia
Members of the Federation Council of Russia (1996–2000)
Frunze Military Academy alumni
Military Academy of the General Staff of the Armed Forces of the Soviet Union alumni
Recipients of the Order of the Red Banner